a.k.a.  is a Japanese film director, screenwriter, and actor.

Life and career
Shinji Imaoka was born in Osaka in 1965. He attended Yokohama City University, but dropped out in 1990 in order to pursue a film career. He entered the film industry as an assistant director at pink film pioneer Satoru Kobayashi's Shishi Productions. There he worked principally under Hisayasu Satō, and also with such directors at Takahisa Zeze and Mototsugu Watanabe. In December 1994 he worked as assistant director to the esteemed Nikkatsu Roman Porno director Tatsumi Kumashiro on his last film, . Imaoka's directorial debut film was  a.k.a. Waiting for the Comet (1995).

In his Behind the Pink Curtain: The Complete History of Japanese Sex Cinema, Jasper Sharp writes that Imaoka's style is quite different from that of his mentor, Hisayasu Satō, and that his approach to the pink film is much closer to Toshiki Satō. Like Toshiki Satō, Imaoka's sex scenes are often sparser than the norm for a pink film, and not given much emphasis. According to Sharp, "[Imaoka's] films possess the same deadpan comic touch that masks a painfully honest emotional core, although Imaoka's peculiar brand of pathos is less wry and more sentimental." Further, he writes, "Imaoka's particular strength is his understated depiction of characters trapped in a rut, desperately reaching out for something they secretly know they can't have."

While Imaoka's approach to the sex scenes has not won him favor with the traditional pink film audience and theater owners, his films have been praised by critics. He has been awarded Best Director at the Pink Grand Prix, and two of his films have been voted the Best Film of the year at the ceremony. In 2000, the Tokyo Athénée Français gave Imaoka a career retrospective tribute which broke the institution's record for attendance.

Partial filmography

Top-ten films, Pink Grand Prix
 1996 Honorable Mention: 
 1999 Honorable Mention: 
 1999 1st place: 
 2005 1st place: 
 2005 8th place:  a.k.a.

Pinky Ribbon Awards
 2006 Silver Prize:  a.k.a.

Bibliography

English

Japanese

References

 
|-
! colspan="3" style="background: #DAA520;" | Pink Grand Prix
|-

1965 births
Japanese bloggers
Japanese male film actors
Japanese film directors
Pink film directors
Japanese screenwriters
Living people
People from Sakai, Osaka
Male bloggers
21st-century screenwriters